Basilica on the Holy Mountain in Głogówko, Poland, is a historic Oratorian, Renaissance Minor Basilica. The shrine is modelled on the Venetian Santa Maria della Salute.

It is located on a raised moraine known as Holy Mountain (Święta Góra) near Gostyń, located to its north. In 2008, the basilica was entered onto the List of Historic Monuments of Poland.

References

Gostyń County
Głogówko
Basilica churches in Poland
The Most Holy Virgin Mary, Queen of Poland